Betty Boop's Hallowe'en Party is a 1933 Fleischer Studios animated short film starring Betty Boop.

Plot

It is Halloween, and Jack Frost (in his ice-covered airplane) covers the fields with frost.  A chilly scarecrow plucks a wind-blown piece of paper out of the air; it is an invitation to Betty's Hallowe'en party ("p.s., Bring Your Lunch").  Betty is mass-producing jack o'lanterns with the help of her animal friends.  The partygoers arrive, and join with Betty in song.  Meanwhile, a hulking gorilla gatecrashes the party, and threatens to ruin the evening.  Betty disguises as a black cat, and her friends turn the table on the beast, and scare him out the party.

Production notes
Betty sings "Let's All Sing Like the Birdies Sing", which features background vocals sung by fellow voice actress Mae Questel along with a studio chorus.

References

External links

 Betty Boop's Hallowe'en Party on YouTube

1933 films
Betty Boop cartoons
1930s American animated films
American black-and-white films
1933 animated films
Paramount Pictures short films
American films about Halloween
Fleischer Studios short films
Short films directed by Dave Fleischer